Floodwood River may refer to:

 Floodwood River (Michigan)
 Floodwood River (Minnesota)